Salsola kali was the botanical name for a species of flowering plants in the amaranth family, whose subspecies have been recently reclassified as two separate species in the genus Kali:

 Kali tragus, formerly Salsola tragus or Salsola kali subsp. tragus: a common weed of disturbed habitats, commonly known as prickly Russian thistle, windwitch, common saltwort, or tumbleweed.
 Kali turgidum, formerly Salsola kali subsp. kali: a salt-resistant plant restricted to the shores of the Baltic Sea, North Sea and the Atlantic Ocean, commonly known as prickly saltwort.

In 2014, Mosyakin et al. proposed to conserve Salsola kali (= Kali turgidum) as nomenclatoral type for the genus Salsola. If the proposal will be accepted, most species of genus Kali would belong to Salsola again, except for some little-known species that could be placed in the genus Soda Fourr.

References

Further reading 
 
 Walter Gutermann: Notulae nomenclaturales 41–45. Neue Namen bei Cruciata und Kali sowie einige kleinere Korrekturen (New names in Cruciata, Kali, and some small corrections). In: Phyton (Horn). 51 (1), 2011, p. 98.

Amaranthaceae
Barilla plants
Flora of Malta